Summerfield is a district in Birmingham, in the West Midlands county of England. The area takes its name from Summerfield House, owned by members of the Chance family, local industrialists, and which stood on the site of the current bandstand in Summerfield Park.

Major roads in the area include Dudley Road, City Road (part of the city's ring road, the A4040), Rotton Park Road, and Icknield Port Road. Gillott Road is named after industrialist and pen maker Joseph Gillott, who built houses in the area.

The former Summerfield School, a board school built in 1878, is now a community centre and is a grade II* listed building. The West Midlands Police's Summerfield Police station sits inside Summerfield Park. The park was established in 1876.

The parish church, Christ Church, is Grade II listed.

The area was formerly served by Icknield Port Road railway station and Rotton Park Road railway station, on the London and North Western Railway's Harborne branch line, but the stations closed in 1931 and 1934 respectively. The trackbed now forms the Harborne Nature Walk.

Neighbouring areas include Edgbaston, Ladywood, and Winson Green. Edgbaston Reservoir is immediately to the south.

References 

Areas of Birmingham, West Midlands